Marxian is a term generally used to refer to things related to Karl Marx other than Marxism. It can refer to:

 Marxian economics
 Marxian class theory

See also 
 Marxism, which is usually referred to as "Marxist", rather than "Marxian"